The Vuelta al Tolima is a road cycling race held annually since 1989 in the Tolima Department of Colombia. Prior to 2002, the race was known as the Clásica del Tolima. Since 2015, a women's edition of the race has also been held.

Winners

Men

Women

References

Cycle races in Colombia
Recurring sporting events established in 1989
Men's road bicycle races
1989 establishments in Colombia